Oleh Kozhushko (born 17 February 1998) is a professional Ukrainian football midfielder who plays for Oleksandriya.

Career
Kozhushko is a product of the Torpedo Mykolaiv and FC Dnipro Youth Sportive School Systems. His first trainers were Ivan Dzyaba (in FC Torpedo) and Ihor Khomenko (in FC Dnipro).

In 2015, he signed a contract with FC Dnipro, and played in the FC Dnipro Dnipropetrovsk reserves. In the main-team squad Kozhushko made his debut as a start-squad player in the match against FC Olimpik Donetsk on 15 May 2016 in the Ukrainian Premier League.

On 20 February 2021, Kozhushko signed for FC Pyunik, leaving the club on 4 June 2021 when his contract was terminated.

Career statistics

References

External links
 

1998 births
Living people
Sportspeople from Mykolaiv
Ukrainian footballers
Ukrainian expatriate footballers
FC Dnipro players
SC Dnipro-1 players
FC Kolos Kovalivka players
FC Chornomorets Odesa players
FC Pyunik players
FC Oleksandriya players
Ukrainian Premier League players
Ukrainian First League players
Ukrainian Second League players
Armenian Premier League players
Expatriate footballers in Armenia
Ukrainian expatriate sportspeople in Armenia

Association football midfielders